Judge Masoud Ahmadi Moghaddasi (‎; 1963 – August 2, 2005) was an Iranian judge, and deputy to Saeed Mortazavi. He was assassinated by Majid Kavousifar on Tehran's Ahmad Ghasir Avenue while commuting home from work.

Moghaddasi was born in 1963 at the Balakhiaban neighbourhood of Mashhad to a poor family. His family was from Yazd.

He had ruled in the case of journalist Akbar Ganji which led to Ganji's imprisonment, and was also involved in the case of Zahra Kazemi. Moghadasi also was in charge of the trial of Iranian famous blogger Mojtaba Saminejad and his friends who were involved in that case. Moghadasi was responsible for the trial sentencing and execution of 1000s

References

External links
Yahoo! News article
BBC news article

1963 births
2005 deaths
Assassinated Iranian people
21st-century Iranian judges
People from Mashhad
People murdered in Iran